Jared William Huffman (born February 18, 1964) is an American lawyer and politician serving as the U.S. representative for California's 2nd congressional district since 2013. A member of the Democratic Party, Huffman represented the 6th district in the California State Assembly from 2006 to 2012. He chaired the Assembly Water, Parks & Wildlife Committee and the Assembly Environmental Caucus. He was elected to Congress in 2012 with more than 70% of the vote, defeating Republican nominee Dan Roberts. His congressional district covers the North Coast from the Golden Gate Bridge to the Oregon border.

Huffman is the only elected member of the U.S. House who openly describes himself as religiously unaffilated and a secular humanist. Huffman is also the only member of Congress who openly rejects the existence of God; independent Senator Kyrsten Sinema has also been reported to be an atheist member of Congress, although she has rejected the label.

Early life, education, and legal career
Huffman graduated from William Chrisman High School in 1982 and in 1986 received his Bachelor of Arts in political science magna cum laude from University of California, Santa Barbara, where he was a member of the Phi Delta Theta Fraternity. At UCSB, Huffman was a three-time All-American volleyball player. He was a member of the USA Volleyball Team in 1987 when the team was ranked  1 in the world and had recently won the World Championship. He graduated cum laude from Boston College Law School in 1990.

Huffman became a consumer attorney specializing in public interest cases. Among his court victories was a case on behalf of the National Organization for Women, which required all California State University campuses to comply with Title IX. Huffman was a senior attorney for the Natural Resources Defense Council. He was also a publicly elected director of the Marin Municipal Water District for 12 years, including three terms as board president.

California State Assembly

Elections
Huffman won the Democratic nomination for the 6th district in a hotly contested June 2006 primary in which he surprised the political establishment with a victory over Pamela Torliatt, a Petaluma city councilwoman, and Cynthia Murray, a Marin County Supervisor who was initially considered the front-runner. Huffman also defeated Assistant State Attorney General Damon Connelly, Marin County Democratic Chairman John Alden, and sociologist Alex Easton-Brown.

Huffman defeated Republican nominee Michael Hartnett by a more than 2:1 margin in the 2006 general election.

Huffman faced two opponents in the 2008 general election: Republican Paul Lavery and Libertarian Timothy Hannan. He won with 70% of the vote, and the 137,873 votes he received were among the most by any California Assembly candidate in 2008. In the Democratic primary, Huffman was unopposed and received 57,213 votes—the most of any California Assemblymember in that election.

In the June 2010 California primary, Huffman defeated Patrick Connally. He defeated Republican nominee Robert Stephens in the general election with more than 70% of the vote—the highest winning margin of any candidate on the ballot in the North Bay that year. Due to term limits, Huffman was unable to seek a fourth Assembly term in 2012.

Tenure
In his first four years as a legislator, Huffman authored and passed more than 40 pieces of legislation. In 2008, he sponsored a bill (AB 2950), which he wrote with internet attorney Daniel Balsam, that aimed to close what its proponents characterized as loopholes in the CAN-SPAM Act that made it more difficult to bring lawsuits against deceptive spammers. The bill passed the State Assembly and Senate, but Governor Arnold Schwarzenegger vetoed it. On February 14, 2011, Huffman co-sponsored a bill with Paul Fong, California Assembly Bill 376, to make it illegal to possess, distribute, or sell shark fins, except for research or commercial purposes.

Committee assignments
Upon his swearing-in on December 4, 2006, Assembly Speaker Fabian Núñez named Huffman chair of the Committee on Environmental Safety and Toxic Materials. In August 2008, the new Assembly Speaker, Karen Bass, named Huffman to chair the Water, Parks & Wildlife Committee.

U.S. House of Representatives

Elections

2012

After 20-year incumbent Lynn Woolsey announced her retirement, Huffman entered the race to run for her seat in the 2nd district, which had been renumbered from the 6th in redistricting. California's 2nd congressional district now covers six counties: Marin, Sonoma, Mendocino, Trinity, Humboldt, and Del Norte.
 
Huffman finished first in the top-two primary, with 37% of the vote. In November, he defeated Republican candidate Dan Roberts 71%–29%.

2014

In his first reelection campaign, Huffman dominated the open primary, receiving 67.9% of the vote against 22.3% for second-place finisher Dale Mensing, a Republican. He defeated Mensing in the general election, 75% to 25%.

2016

Huffman defeated Mensing again, receiving 68.3% of the primary vote to Mensing's 15.7% and 76.5% of the general election vote to Mensing's 23.5%.

2018

Huffman defeated Mensing a third time, with 72.5% of the primary vote to Mensing's 20.9% and 77.0% of the vote in the general election.

2020

Huffman defeated Mensing a fourth time, with 67.7% of the primary vote to Mensing's 18.9% and 75.7% of the general election vote.

Tenure
In April 2018, Huffman, Jerry McNerney, Jamie Raskin, and Dan Kildee launched the Congressional Freethought Caucus. Its stated goals include "pushing public policy formed on the basis of reason, science, and moral values"; promoting the "separation of church and state"; and opposing discrimination against "atheists, agnostics, humanists, seekers, religious and non-religious persons", among others. Huffman and Raskin are co-chairs.

In the aftermath of the United States Conference of Catholic Bishops's vote to draft a document regarding Catholic politicians' worthiness to receive Communion. Huffman accused the Church of "weaponizing" its religion, and suggested that it should lose its tax-exempt status.

As of October 2021, Huffman had voted in line with Joe Biden's stated position 100% of the time.

Opposed legislation
Preventing Government Waste and Protecting Coal Mining Jobs in America – a bill that would "amend the Surface Mining Control and Reclamation Act of 1977 to require state programs for regulation of surface coal mining to incorporate the necessary rule concerning excess spoil, coal mine waste, and buffers for perennial and intermittent streams published by the Office of Surface Mining Reclamation and Enforcement on December 12, 2008." Huffman opposed the bill, arguing that it should be opposed because the supporters "believe coal companies should be allowed to blow the tops off mountains and dump the waste into streams, no matter what the science says about the consequence for our environment and the public health."
Water Rights Protection Act – a bill that would prevent federal agencies from requiring certain entities to relinquish their water rights to the United States in order to use public lands. The bill was a reaction to the United States Forest Service's decision to pursue a "new regulation to demand that water rights be transferred to the federal government as a condition for obtaining permits needed to operate 121 ski resorts that cross over federal lands." Huffman opposed the bill and accused the House Natural Resources Subcommittee on Water and Power of being unnecessarily "adversarial" and having "unfairly vilified" the Forest Service after a committee hearing about the bill.

Committee assignments

Committee on Transportation and Infrastructure
Subcommittee on Highways and Transit
Subcommittee on Railroads, Pipelines, and Hazardous Materials
Subcommittee on Water Resources and Environment
Committee on Natural Resources
Subcommittee on Water, Oceans, and Wildlife (chair)
Subcommittee on Energy and Mineral Resources
Subcommittee on Oversight and Investigations
Select Committee on the Climate Crisis

Caucus memberships
Congressional Arts Caucus
Congressional Freethought Caucus
Congressional Progressive Caucus
Medicare for All Caucus

Political positions

Abortion

Huffman opposed the overturning of Roe v. Wade, calling it "sad, outrageous" and saying, "it's going to be tragic for millions of women in this country."

United States Supreme Court

In 2022, Huffman described the U.S. Supreme Court as "extreme, out of touch" and "right-wing" in response to Dobbs v. Jackson Women's Health Organization.

Personal life 
Huffman lives in San Rafael with his wife, Susan, and their two children. His hobby is winemaking.

In a November 9, 2017, interview with The Washington Posts Michelle Boorstein, Huffman said, "I suppose you could say I don't believe in God."

Electoral history

California State Assembly

U.S. House of Representatives

References

Further reading

External links

Congressman Jared Huffman official U.S. House website
Jared Huffman for Congress campaign website 

|-

1964 births
21st-century American politicians
American atheists
American humanists
American men's volleyball players
Boston College Law School alumni
20th-century American lawyers
21st-century American lawyers
20th-century American politicians
California lawyers
Living people
Democratic Party members of the California State Assembly
Democratic Party members of the United States House of Representatives from California
Politicians from Independence, Missouri
People from San Rafael, California
UC Santa Barbara Gauchos men's volleyball players